Lynn is a surname of Irish origin, English and or Scottish. It has a number of separate derivations:
A locational surname from any of a number of places in England, the place name in turn may have derived from Brittonic lenna (pool or lake).
A locational surname in Scotland of Irish origin, the place name derived from Scottish Gaelic linne, in turn from Old Irish linn; meaning water feature or pool.
A surname derived from a personal name in the north of Ireland, originally O'Fhloinn, later O' Loinn, O'Lynn and Lynn. {See also the surnames Flynn and O'Flynn.}

The earliest recorded instance of the surname is Aedricus de Lenna of King's Lynn (1177).

People with the surname include:

Arts and entertainment
Allison Lynn (born 1971), American author
Amber Lynn (born 1964), pornographic actress
Ann Lynn (1933–2020), British actress
Barbara Lynn (born 1943), American musician
Barry C. Lynn, American author
Betty Lynn (1926–2021), American actress
Cheryl Lynn (born 1957), American musician
Cynthia Lynn (born 1936), Latvian actress
Diana Lynn (1926–1971), American actress
Eleanor Lynn (1916–1996), American actress
Elizabeth A. Lynn (born 1946), American author
Emmett Lynn (1897–1958), American actor
Frances Lynn, English journalist and author
Ginger Lynn (born 1964), pornographic actress
Henry Lynn (1895–1994), American director and screenwriter
Jeffrey Lynn (1909–1995), American actor
Jenny Lynn (photographer) (born 1953), American photographer
Jonathan Lynn (born 1943), English actor and writer
Common (born Lonnie Rashid Lynn Jr. in 1972), American rapper 
Loretta Lynn (1932–2022), American country singer-songwriter
Margaret E. Lynn (1924–2002), American theatre director
Meredith Scott Lynn, American actress
Porsche Lynn (born 1962), pornographic actress
Ralph Lynn (1882–1962), British actor
Robert Lynn (director) (1918–1982), British film and TV director
Robert L. Lynn (1931–2020), American poet
Sherry Lynn, American voice actress
Tami Lynn (born 1942), American musician
Tanisha Lynn (born 1978), American actress
Vera Lynn (1917–2020), British musician and The Forces' Sweetheart during WW2.

Business and politics
Bob Lynn (1933–2020), American politician
Charlie Lynn (born 1945), Australian politician
C. Stephen Lynn, American businessman
Evelyn J. Lynn (born 1930), American politician
Gerry Lynn (politician) (1952–2020), American politician
James Thomas Lynn (1927–2010), American political official
John P. Lynn, American businessman
Oliver Lynn (1926–1996), American talent manager and husband of Loretta Lynn
Kathleen Lynn (1874–1955), Irish politician and doctor
Laurence Lynn, Jr., American political scientist
Mark Lynn (born 1958/1959), American businessman
Robert Lynn (Australian politician) (1873–1928)
Robert Lynn (Northern Ireland politician) (1873–1945), Ulster politician
Uriel Lynn, Israeli politician

Military
Alan R. Lynn, U.S. Army lieutenant general
John Lynn (VC) (1887–1915), English recipient of the Victoria Cross
John A. Lynn, American military historian

Sports
Alex Lynn, English racing driver
Anthony Lynn (born 1968), American football player and coach
Billy Lynn (born 1947), English footballer
Byrd Lynn (1889–1940), American baseball player
Chris Lynn (born 1990), Australian cricketer
David Lynn (golfer) (born 1973), English golfer
Fred Lynn (born 1952), American baseball player
Gerry Lynn, Australian footballer
Janet Lynn (born 1953), American figure skater
Jenny Lynn, fitness and figure competitor
Jerry Lynn (born 1963), American wrestler
Jerry Lynn (baseball) (1916–1972), American baseball player
Joe Lynn (1925–1992), English footballer
Johnnie Lynn (born 1956), American football player
Kendrick Lynn (born 1982), New Zealand rugby player
Lance Lynn (born 1987), American baseball player
Lonnie Lynn (born 1943), American basketball player
Mike Lynn (1936–2012), American football executive
Mike Lynn (basketball) (born 1945), American basketball player
Sammy Lynn (1920–1995), English footballer
Stan Lynn (1928–2002), English footballer 
Stevie Lynn, English wrestler
Vic Lynn (1925–2010), Canadian ice hockey player

Other
Audra Lynn (born 1980), American model and Playboy Playmate of the Month
Barry W. Lynn (born 1948), American minister and activist
Cassandra Lynn (born 1979), American model and Playboy Playmate of the Month
David Lynn (architect) (1873–1961), American architect
Donna Lynn (born 1936), American model and Playboy Playmate of the Month
Greg Lynn (born 1964), American architect
Nancy Lynn (c. 1956 – 2006), American aerobatic pilot 
Naomi B. Lynn (born 1933), American academic
Peter Lynn (born 1946), New Zealand kite flier
Regina Lynn (born 1971), American blogger
Richard Lynn (born 1930), British psychologist
Robert J. Lynn (New Hampshire judge), justice of the New Hampshire Supreme Court
Wiley Lynn (c. 1891 – 1932), American murderer
William Henry Lynn (1829–1915), British architect

See also
Linn (surname)
Lyn (surname)
Lynne (surname)

References